Ali Malakouti (born in Qom from Azerbaijanis family Moslem Malakouti) is an Iranian Shiite cleric and politician. He is a member of the 5thAssembly of Experts from the East Azerbaijan electorate. Malakouti won his membership with 688,700 votes.

See also 

 List of members in the Fifth Term of the Council of Experts

References

Iranian Azerbaijanis
Members of the Assembly of Experts
Living people
1948 births
People from Qom